Begonia echinosepala is a species of flowering plant in the family Begoniaceae, native to southeastern Brazil. A bush reaching , it is infrequently offered in the nursery trade.

References

echinosepala
Endemic flora of Brazil
Flora of Southeast Brazil
Plants described in 1871